Highlights from the Revenge of Odysseus is the sixth EP by American power metal band Manowar, released digitally on streaming services on June 22, 2022. The EP is based on the Odyssey, Homer's tale of the great hero Odysseus and his long and perilous quest to return to his wife and son, and is a sampler of a bigger work to be released. The tracks premiered worldwide at the "Release Athens" festival in Athens Greece on 22 June 2022. The same one where they also started "The Revenge of Odysseus" anniversary tour.

Composition
For the EP, Manowar had gone to great lengths to honor the historic tale, similar to what they had done previously on tracks such as their infamous 28-minute tale "Achilles, Agony, and Ecstasy in Eight Parts."

Reception
The release has garnered generally negative reviews from critics. Adam McCann of Metal Digest called it "a poor EP wearing crackerjack clothes" and stated in his review that he had felt cheated with two of the five tracks being just under a minute. While they enjoyed Rotting Christ's Tricarico's powerful voice on "Where Eagles Fly" they deplored Eric Adams limping for six and a half minutes on "Immortal." "Does this EP make the listener want to don their helmet, breastplate, shield, and grab their hoplite spear? Does it make them want to defend Ithaca with all their might? The answer is no. This is a piss-poor EP and if you see wimps and posers wearing crackerjack clothes… it is no bloody wonder. This is literally for completionists only." German webzine Hellfire Magazin gave it a mixed review, saying how "Athena's Theme" was ultimately dispensable, and "Telemachus – Part I" is nothing more than a radio play passage written in ancient Greek. After the cheezy balled "Where Eagles Fly" and another radio play track preparing the listener yet again (in greek), for the final track "Immortal" which they did state as a 'highlight'. They ended with concluding that for them, 'Highlights From The Revenge Of Odysseus' "isn't any better than “The Final Battle I” and rather confirms my opinion that it's really time for MANOWAR to step down as long as the fans of the first six/seven albums aren't completely sold out pissed off. And to be honest, if those are supposed to be the highlights, I really don't want to hear the rest."

Track listing

Personnel
Band
 Joey DeMaio - bass
 Eric Adams - vocals
 EVMartel - guitar
Guest/Session
 Kostas Kazakos - narration (track 4)
 Konstantinos Kazakos - narration (track 2)
 Sakis Tolis - narration (track 2)
 Chiara Tricarico - vocals (track 3)
Miscellaneous staff
 Sakis Tolis - lyrics (tracks 2, 4)

References 

Manowar albums
2022 EPs